Sugar Valley Airport  is a privately owned, private use airport in Davie County, North Carolina, United States. It is located six nautical miles (11 km) northeast of the central business district of Mocksville, North Carolina.

Facilities and aircraft 
Sugar Valley Airport covers an area of 70 acres (28 ha) at an elevation of 731 feet (223 m) above mean sea level. It has one asphalt paved runway designated 2/20 which measures 2,424 by 36 feet (739 x 12 m).

See also 
 List of airports in North Carolina

References 

Airports in North Carolina
Transportation in Davie County, North Carolina
Buildings and structures in Davie County, North Carolina